James R. "Jim" Rosenthal (March 1, 1968 – September 17, 2011) was an American film producer and production manager.

Filmography

External links

1968 births
2011 deaths
Film producers from Illinois
Businesspeople from Chicago
20th-century American businesspeople